Fritz Bamberger may refer to:
Fritz Bamberger (painter) (1814–1873), German painter
Fritz Bamberger (scholar) (1902–1984), German Jewish scholar